Clinton Anderson is an Australian-American natural horsemanship practitioner.  He created a training program known as Downunder Horsemanship. He is featured in a number of magazine articles on horse training, has written a book about his methods, is a clinician who tours the United States, and has a television program on RFD-TV as well as an internet TV presence.

Early life
Anderson was born and raised in Australia. He left school at age 15 to begin a series of apprenticeships with several Australian horse trainers. Three years later, he opened his own training facility.

Career
Anderson moved to the United States in 1996. In 1997 he began teaching nationwide horsemanship clinics. In 2001 he launched his own TV show. He has competed in national reining competitions. In 2003 he competed in the first Road to the Horse colt-starting competition and won with Hancock Sug, defeating Curt Pate and John Lyon's son, Josh Lyons.  In 2005, he won the second Road to the Horse competition over Craig Cameron and Van Hargis. He competed in 2011 but lost to Chris Cox, and is scheduled to compete again in 2017.

In 2020, Anderson moved from his previous training facility in Stephenville, Texas to Farmington, Arkansas. There, he continues to operate Downunder Horsemanship.

References

Western horse trainers
Australian horse trainers
Natural horsemanship